Meares Stadium is a 5,000-capacity stadium located in Mars Hill, North Carolina where it serves as home to the Mars Hill College Lions.

Meares Stadium has gained a reputation as a tough place to play due to its location in the windy North Carolina mountains. Winds can get high enough to easily throw a ball around, and even make it tough on smaller athletes.  In 2007, the college began a reconstruction project at Meares Stadium, which will be completed by the 2007 football season.  When completed, the facility will have a new pressbox, permanent visitor's bleachers, and a reconstructed set of main stands.  Additionally, the current grass surface will be replaced with FieldTurf.

External links
 Mars Hill College - Fitness

College football venues
Soccer venues in North Carolina
Buildings and structures in Madison County, North Carolina
Mars Hill Lions football